Ivan David (born 24 September 1952) is a Czech psychiatrist, former Minister of Health and former director of the Psychiatric Hospital of Bohnice.

He graduated from Prague High School and the Faculty of General Medicine of Charles University. He then worked as a psychiatrist. From 1998 to 2002, he was a Member of Parliament for the Social Democrats, and from 1998 to 1999, he was Minister of Health. He is the grandson of Jindřich Šnobl (1903-1971), a former deputy managing director of ČKD-Stalingrad. Ivan David was a director of the psychiatric hospital in Bohnice until April 2008.

Ivan David is election leader of Freedom and Direct Democracy in 2019 European Parliament election in the Czech Republic.

On 15 September 2022, he was one of 16 MEPs who voted against condemning President Daniel Ortega of Nicaragua for human rights violations, in particular the arrest of Bishop Rolando Álvarez.

References

External links
Official site

Czech psychiatrists
1952 births
Living people
Czech Social Democratic Party MPs
Health ministers of the Czech Republic
Members of the Chamber of Deputies of the Czech Republic (1998–2002)
Charles University alumni
Czech Social Democratic Party Government ministers
Freedom and Direct Democracy MEPs
MEPs for the Czech Republic 2019–2024
Physicians from Prague
Politicians from Prague